is a retired Japanese freestyle wrestler. He competed at the 1960 Olympics and 1961 World Championships in the 62 kg division and finished fourth on both occasions.

References

1939 births
Living people
Olympic wrestlers of Japan
Wrestlers at the 1960 Summer Olympics
Japanese male sport wrestlers
20th-century Japanese people